Grammaticus is the Latin word for grammarian; see Grammarian (Greco-Roman world). It is also used to refer to a Roman patrician school.

As an agnomen, it may refer to:
 Ammonius Grammaticus (4th century), Greek grammarian
 Diomedes Grammaticus (4th century), Latin grammarian
 Musaeus Grammaticus (6th century), Greek poet
 Virgilius Maro Grammaticus (7th century), early medieval Latin writer
 John VII of Constantinople, known as John VII Grammaticus (9th century), Ecumenical Patriarch of Constantinople
 Ælfric of Eynsham, known in Latin as Alfricus Grammaticus (10th century), Anglo-Saxon abbot and author
 Saxo Grammaticus (circa 1150-1220), Danish medieval historian

As a pseudonym:
 Edward Musgrave Blaiklock, (1903-1983), British born New Zealand author, wrote as "Grammaticus"

See also
 Damian Grammaticas